Coleophora ghorella is a moth of the family Coleophoridae. It is found in Jordan (the Dead Sea region).

References

ghorella
Moths described in 1955
Moths of the Middle East